Kent Business School (KBS) is the business school of the University of Kent. Although there are two business schools known as KBS, generally people seem to consider KBS as King's Business School first because it was established in 1980, eight years before Kent Business School. Since opening in 1988, it offers undergraduate, postgraduate, PhD degree programmes and The Kent MBA.

KBS is sited in two locations, at The University of Kent campus in Canterbury and at Medway on Chatham Historic Dockyard.

In March 2017, Kent Business School at the Canterbury Campus moved into its new home, The Sibson Building, named after the University of Kent's third Vice-Chancellor, Professor Robin Sibson.

Rankings & reputation
League Table Performance
 31st in the UK for Business and Management Studies (The Complete University Guide 2021)
 26th in the UK for Accounting and Finance (The Complete University Guide 2021)
 9th in the UK for Marketing (The Complete University Guide 2021)

Degree programmes
The University of Kent's business school currently runs a variety of Undergraduate, Postgraduate, PhD programmes and an MBA. At undergraduate level, competition for places at KBS are relatively competitive with the average KBS student achieving ABB-AAB at A-Level to secure a place

Undergraduate 

 BSc (Hons) Accounting and Finance
 BA (Hons) Business and Management
 BA (Hons) Business (top-up)
 BSc (Hons) Finance and Investment
 BSc (Hons) International Business
 BSc (Hons) Management
 BSc (Hons) Marketing

Programmes are also offered with the opportunity to take a Year Abroad or a Year in Industry.

Postgraduate 

 MSc Business Analytics
 MSc Digital Marketing and Analytics
 MSc Finance (Finance and Management)
 MSc Finance (Finance, Investment and Risk)
 MSc Finance (Financial Markets)
 MSc Finance (International Banking and Finance)
 MSc Healthcare Management
 MSc Human Resource Management
 MSc International Business and Management
 MSc Logistics and Supply Chain Management
 MSc Management
 MSc Marketing
 MSc Project Management
 The Kent MBA

PhD 

 Accounting
 Finance
 Management
 Management Science
 Marketing
 Operational Research

Organisational relationships 
The Business School has a variety of links with companies and organisations as well as other academic institutions.

The school's academic network includes:

 Austria: Universität Innsbruck, Innsbruck
 Germany: EBS Universität für Wirtschaft und Recht, Wiesbaden
 Germany: Freie Universität Berlin, Berlin
 France: ESSEC Business School, Paris
 France: Neoma Business School, Rouen and Rheims
 France: ESC Rennes School of Business, Rennes
 France: Jean Moulin University Lyon 3, Lyon
 Italy: Università Carlo Cattaneo, Castellanza
 Italy: Università degli Studi di Firenze, Florence
 Spain: IE Business School, Madrid
 Sweden: Stockholm University, Stockholm
 China: Renmin University of China, Beijing
 Hong Kong: Hong Kong Baptist University
 Hong Kong: University of Hong Kong

Research 
Kent Business School carries out research related activities including workshops, conferences and research seminar series. This has led to a large number of international collaborations and to over 200 co-authored papers with international partners.

Research groups include; Accounting, Finance, Management Science, Marketing, People Management and Organisation, Strategy and International Business.

Research centres include; The Centre for Quantitative Finance and The Centre for Logistics and Heuristic Optimisation.

References 

 

Educational institutions established in 1965
City of Canterbury
Medway
1965 establishments in England